The Soviet working class was, according to Marxist–Leninist theory, supposed to be the Soviet Union's ruling class during its transition from the socialist stage of development to full communism. However, it is commonly argued that its influence over production and policies diminished as the Soviet Union's existence progressed.

Employment

Productivity
Several Soviets expressed concern over the focus of sharp growth in per capita income over that of labor productivity. A problem was that wages in the Soviet Union could neither be used as a way of disciplining workers or as an incentive system, except in a limited capacity. Soviet workers were not controlled by the stick and carrot (the carrot being increased wages and the stick being unemployment).

Women

The early Soviet government ensued a policy of pushing more women into urban industrial employment; these policies were ideologically, politically and/or economically driven. The post-revolutionary turmoils which took place hampered any improvements for immediate prospects of increased employment of women in urban areas.  The 13th Party Congress, held in 1924, took employment of women very seriously, and were alarmed with the developments in the country; employment of women had decreased to 23 percent of the total workforce from 25 percent. By 1928, the proportion of women working in the workforce had increased to 24 percent. During Joseph Stalin's rule the number of women working increased from 24 percent of the workforce in 1928 to 39 percent in 1940. In the period 1940–1950 women were 92 percent of new entrants in employment; this is mostly due to the exodus of the males who fought during World War II. As seen in the table, the return of males to civilian life decreased women employment;  56 percent of the workforce were women in 1945, it decreased to 47 in 1950.

A last, major campaign to increase women employment was initiated in the 1960s because of labor shortages across the country. A 1959 census stated that out of the 13 million able-strong people who could work, but didn't, 89 percent of them were women. These women lived in small urban areas with low, or bad child-care facilities. In the period 1960–1971, 18 million new women were employed, the majority of them came from households. This source of labor was exhausted nationwide, except within the Soviet Muslim community. Employing women was a major problem in Soviet Central Asia, the majority of women working the Central Asian republics were of Russian or Ukrainian ethnicity. An example, in 1973 54 percent of the population of Turkmenistan were employed, of these, less than one-third of them were ethnic Turkmen.

Similar to capitalism, patriarchy and the role of women played an important part in Soviet development. Before Stalin became premier, the government initiated a policy which ended discrimination against women in the workplace. However, Stalin's government was more conservative, and overturned several Bolshevik legislations. While not opposing that women should work, women were given low-level jobs and were, in the workplace, on the bottom of the social ladder. Women were given the lowest-paid jobs and low-skilled jobs. Another problem was that while women were proletarianised, their family burdens increased – women were still expected to continue their traditional duties at home and in the family.

Despite discrimination, several advances were made. For instance, in 1926 9 out of every 10 working women worked in agriculture, in 1959 this had decreased to half of working women and in 1975 under a third of women worked in agriculture. A major reason for the increasing role which women held in the workforce was due to the fact that, by 1960, there were more women than men in the Soviet Union. Women were the logical replacement for men – a source which was becoming dry. Another reason for the increasing role of women was that average wages were too small; women needed to work if the picture of the average Soviet family would become reality.

Standard of living

Working conditions

Working conditions for a Soviet worker changed over time; for instance, at the beginning of the socialist government, they had pursued a policy of worker participation at the enterprise level. During Joseph Stalin's crash-industrialisation drive, workers lost their right to participate in the functioning of the enterprise, and their working conditions deteriorated. In 1940, for example, a decree was promulgated and became law stating that a worker could be arrested if he had three accumulated absences, late arrivals or changed jobs without the official authorisation. Shock work, which meant that workers had to work past regular hours, was introduced alongside central planning.  During World War II the pressure on workers increased and it was expected of them to take on Herculean efforts in their work. In the post-war years conditions did not improve but in fact worsened in some cases. For instance, small theft became illegal; this had been allowed for several years to compensate for workers' low salaries. The situation for the common worker improved during the post-Stalin years, and some of the worst measures approved by the Stalin administration to improve worker productivity were repealed. Because of the lack of a stick and carrot policy under the Brezhnev administration, worker productivity and discipline decreased during the 1970s.

Wages

Since unemployment was rendered unviable through various acts of legislation, the Soviet worker, in contrast to a Capitalist worker, was more secure economically. In return for working, a Soviet worker would get an individual return in the form of a money wage; however, during the period under the New Economic Policy (1920s), hyperinflation rendered money effectively useless, and wages sometimes occurred through bartering . Money wage in Soviet parlance was not the same as in Capitalist countries. The money wage was set at the top of the administrative system, and it was the same administrative system which also set bonuses.  Wages were 80 percent of the average Soviet worker's income, with the remaining 20 percent coming in the form of bonuses.  The Soviet wage system tried systematically to make wages more equal; for instance, the relationship between wages was termed "ITRs", a measure of comparing wages across occupations.  For engineers and other technical workers ITR was 1.68 in 1955, but had decreased to 1.21 in 1977. Social wages were also an important part of the general standard of living for an average household; it stood at 23.4 percent of income for the average Soviet worker and their family, and at 19.1 percent for the family income of collective farmers.  In the period between 1971–81, the social wage grew faster than the money wage; the money wage grew by 45 percent for workers and employees and 72 for workers at collective farms. In contrast, per capita income from social wages increased by 81 percent.  Social wage took many forms; it could be improved health, education, transport or food subsidies, which was the responsibility of the state, or the improvement (or introduction) of sanitation and working facilities.

Social benefits
The access to use values by the common Soviet worker was not determined by money wages, but rather by a position in the official hierarchy, access to privilege or the privileged, access to foreign currency, where a person lived, influence and access to the black market. In contrast to capitalist societies, money was not the cornerstone of life – a Soviet person would not come into contact with more use-values by the amount of money he or she had.

References

Notes

Bibliography

 

 
 

Labor in the Soviet Union
Society of the Soviet Union
Working class in Asia
Working class in Europe